Dan Krauss is an American film director and cinematographer.

Biography
Krauss is best known for his two Oscar-nominated documentary films The Death of Kevin Carter (2005), and Extremis (2016) in the Academy Award for Best Documentary (Short Subject) category at the 78th
and 89th Academy Awards respectively. In 2014, Krauss directed the feature documentary, The Kill Team, winner of the Independent Spirit Awards' Truer than Fiction Award and Grand Jury Prize at the Tribeca Film Festival. Krauss graduated with a M.J. from the UC Berkeley Graduate School of Journalism.

Filmography
 Inequality for All (2013)
 The Kill Team(2014)
 The Death of Kevin Carter (2005)
 Nova (2007-2016)
 O.J.: Made in America (2016)
 Extremis (2016)
 The Kill Team (2019)
 5B (2019)

References

External links
 
 Dan Krauss at The Kill Team

Living people
American producers
American directors
UC Berkeley Graduate School of Journalism alumni
Year of birth missing (living people)